Lowell Schoenfeld (April 1, 1920 – February 6, 2002) was an American mathematician known for his work in analytic number theory.

Career
Schoenfeld received his Ph.D. in 1944 from University of Pennsylvania under the direction of Hans Rademacher.

In 1953, as an assistant professor at the University of Illinois Urbana-Champaign, he married (as his second wife) associate professor Josephine M. Mitchell, causing the university to fire her from her tenured position under its anti-nepotism rules while allowing him to keep his more junior tenure-track job. They both resigned in protest, and after several short-term positions they were both able to obtain faculty positions at Pennsylvania State University in 1958. They were both promoted to full professor in 1961, and moved to the University at Buffalo in 1968.

Contributions
Schoenfeld is known for obtaining the following results in 1976, assuming the Riemann hypothesis:

for all x ≥ 2657, based on the prime-counting function π(x) and the logarithmic integral function li(x), and

for all x ≥ 73.2, based on the second Chebyshev function ψ(x).

References

External links

1920 births
2002 deaths
20th-century American mathematicians
21st-century American mathematicians
Number theorists
University of Pennsylvania alumni
University of Illinois Urbana-Champaign faculty
Pennsylvania State University faculty
University at Buffalo faculty